SERCA, or sarco/endoplasmic reticulum Ca2+-ATPase, or SR Ca2+-ATPase, is a calcium ATPase-type P-ATPase. Its major function is to transport calcium from the cytosol into the sarcoplasmic reticulum.

Function
SERCA is a P-type ATPase. It resides in the sarcoplasmic reticulum (SR) within myocytes. It is a Ca2+ ATPase that transfers Ca2+ from the cytosol of the cell to the lumen of the SR. This uses energy from ATP hydrolysis during muscle relaxation.

There are 3 major domains on the cytoplasmic face of SERCA: the phosphorylation and nucleotide-binding domains, which form the catalytic site, and the actuator domain, which is involved in the transmission of major conformational changes.

In addition to its calcium-transporting functions, SERCA1 generates heat in brown adipose tissue and in skeletal muscles. Along with the heat it naturally produces due to its inefficiency in pumping  ions, when it binds to a regulator called sarcolipin it stops pumping and functions solely as an ATP hydrolase. This mechanism of thermogenesis is widespread in mammals and in endothermic fishes.

Regulation
The rate at which SERCA moves Ca2+ across the SR membrane can be controlled by the regulatory protein phospholamban (PLB/PLN). SERCA is not as active when PLB is bound to it. Increased β-adrenergic stimulation reduces the association between SERCA and PLB by the phosphorylation of PLB by PKA.  When PLB is associated with SERCA, the rate of Ca2+ movement is reduced; upon dissociation of PLB, Ca2+ movement increases.

Another protein, calsequestrin, binds calcium within the SR and helps to reduce the concentration of free calcium within the SR, which assists SERCA so that it does not have to pump against such a high concentration gradient. The SR has a much higher concentration of Ca2+ (10,000x) inside when compared to the cytoplasmic Ca2+ concentration. SERCA2 can be regulated by microRNAs, for instance miR-25 suppresses SERCA2 in heart failure.

For experimental purposes, SERCA can be inhibited by thapsigargin and induced by istaroxime.

SERCA function is upregulated in the skeletal muscle of rabbits and in rodent myocardium by thyroid hormones. This mechanism may contribute to the proarrhythmogenic effect of thyrotoxicosis.

Paralogs
There are 3 major paralogs, SERCA1-3, which are expressed at various levels in different cell types.  
 ATP2A1 – SERCA1
 ATP2A2 – SERCA2
 ATP2A3 – SERCA3

There are additional post-translational isoforms of both SERCA2 and SERCA3, which serve to introduce the possibility of cell-type-specific Ca2+-reuptake responses as well as increasing the overall complexity of the Ca2+ signaling mechanism.

References

External links 
 

Transmembrane proteins